Dias Creek (also known as Dyars Creek, Dyer's Creek or Dyers Creek) is an unincorporated community located in Middle Township, in Cape May County, New Jersey, United States. The community is traversed by Route 47, and primarily consists of farmland, woods, and campgrounds for vacationers.

A post office was established in 1850, with Charles K. Holmes as the first postmaster.

Education
Dias Creek is served by the Middle Township School District, which operates Middle Township High School. Countywide schools include Cape May County Technical High School and the Cape May County Special Services School District.

Wineries
 Jessie Creek Winery

References 

Middle Township, New Jersey
Unincorporated communities in Cape May County, New Jersey
Unincorporated communities in New Jersey